Indonesia-Tokyo Mosque, also known as Meguro Mosque, is a mosque in Meguro, Tokyo, Japan. With the support and the further communication between the Family of Indonesian Islamic Community (KMII) board, the Indonesian Embassy in Tokyo, and the Ministry of Foreign Affairs of Indonesia, the groundbreaking was carried out during the 2015 Eid al-Fitr festival by the incumbent Indonesian Ambassador to Japan, Yusron Ihza Mahendra.

History 
The project was initiated by  Indonesian citizens living in Tokyo, and the construction began in 2015. Although it has been planned 15 years ago by the administrators of the KMII as well as the figures and intellectuals residing in the city, the availability of funds and the location had become the main obstacle.

Facilities 
The mosque has the maximum capacity of up to 270 pilgrims and located within the complex of the Republic of Indonesian School in Tokyo (SRIT). The building design consists of four floors with a total land area of 200 square meters and a floor area of 600 square meters. The slope of the land is adjusted to the direction of qibla. There are two basements consist the mosque. In the first basement, to the right of the outside entrance, there are libraries and cultural centers of Indonesia. Inquiries and questions about Islam or Indonesia can be served in this room. The second basement is made specifically for the restroom and ablution place, and not the prayer room. In addition, there is a common kitchen that can be used for activities that have been implemented by the local Muslim institutions or organizations. The prayer room consists of the first basement, the first floor for men, and the second floor for women. On the first floor, there is a connecting door with a ramp to facilitate wheelchair users. The second floor is connected to SRIT hall so it can be used for massive congregational prayers such as Friday prayers and Eid prayers. Emergency parking space is available for ambulance and access for wheelchair users to enter the mosque.

See also
 List of mosques in Japan

References

External links
Official Website of Indonesia-Tokyo Mosque

21st-century mosques
Buildings and structures in Meguro
Mosques in Tokyo